Venetian Way (March 23, 1957 – October 17, 1964) was an American Thoroughbred racehorse best known for winning the 1960 Kentucky Derby.

Background
Venetian Way was a chestnut horse bred in Kentucky by John W. Greathouse. He was purchased by Chicago, Illinois businessman Isaac Blumberg who raced him under the nom de course of Sunny Blue Farm. Venetian Way was trained by Victor Sovinski of Kankakee, Illinois. He was named after a street in Miami Beach.

Racing career
At age two, Venetian Way made nine starts winning four times. Of his eleven starts at age three, he earned three more wins.  Leading up to the 1960 U.S. Triple Crown series, Venetian Way ran second to Bally Ache in the Florida Derby. He was sent off as the third parimutuel betting choice in the Kentucky Derby behind favorite Tompion and second choice, Bally Ache.

1960 Triple Crown

In the 1960 Kentucky Derby- the "drugstore Derby"- Venetian Way beat Bally Ache. Venetian Way was a sore horse who responded admirably to butazolidin, legal in Kentucky at the time. When Venetian Way ran in the Preakness two weeks later without the help of butazolidin (pain-killing drugs are not legal in Maryland), he did not finish in the money while the sound-legged Bally Ache won. The performance of Venetian Way with and without butazolidin and other similar cases convinced the Kentucky State Racing Commission that drugs were unfair to the horse and to the public.

Ridden in the Kentucky Derby by future U.S. Racing Hall of Fame jockey Bill Hartack, Venetian Way remained within striking distance, then passed Bally Ache as they came around the final turn heading into the homestretch and won going away by 3½ lengths. In the ensuing 1960 Preakness Stakes, Venetian Way finished fifth to winner Bally Ache. Trainer Vic Sovinski was unhappy with how Hartack was riding the colt while training for the Belmont, and he sacked him. Venetian Way ran second behind Celtic Ash, who was ridden by Hartack, in the longest of the Triple Crown races, the 1½ mile Belmont Stakes.

Stud record
Retired to stud for the 1961 season, Venetian Way was not successful as a sire.

In popular culture
In the Stephen King novel 11/22/63, Jake Epping, the novel's protagonist, claims his largest successful bet was on Venetian Way in the 1960 Kentucky Derby.

Pedigree

References

 Venetian Way's 1960 Kentucky Derby

1957 racehorse births
1964 racehorse deaths
Racehorses bred in Kentucky
Racehorses trained in the United States
Kentucky Derby winners
Thoroughbred family 4-m